The Lanzhou–Hezuo railway or Lanhe railway (Chinese: 兰州至合作铁路 or 兰合铁路) is a railway line under construction that will connect Lanzhou to Linxia and Hezuo by rail. It is proposed to continue the line from Hezuo to Chengdu. The railway line will be the first railway to be constructed in Linxia and Gannan.

Although an existing railway connects Lanzhou to Yongjing, the new Lanhe railway will follow a different route.

History
The initial feasibility study was presented in 2009. In 2011, the Ministry of Railways requested a technical study for the railway, this was completed in 2013. Construction started in December 2014 and was originally planned to be completed in 2019. However, the designs were adjusted and construction was suspended. In 2015 it was announced that the design speed was increased 120km/h to 200km/h, and a new feasibility study was to be completed by 2016.

In 2019 it was announced that the construction would resume by the end of the year. Construction is by the China Railway Bureau 20th Construction Group at a total investment of CNY 22.987 billion.

Main stations
 Xigu Station
 Liujiaxia Station
 Linxia Station
 Shuangcheng Station
 Tangga'an Station
 Hezuo Station

External links
 Lanhe railway on Openstreetmap

References

Rail transport in Gansu
Railway lines in China